Alexeyenkovo is a rural locality (a selo) in Alexeyevsky District, Belgorod Oblast, Russia. The population was 292 as of 2010. There are 6 streets.

Geography 
Alexeyenkovo is located 20 km southeast of Alexeyevka (the district's administrative centre) by road. Pyshnograyev is the nearest rural locality.

References 

Rural localities in Alexeyevsky District, Belgorod Oblast
Biryuchensky Uyezd